The 1898 Southern Intercollegiate Athletic Association football season was the college football games played by the members schools of the Southern Intercollegiate Athletic Association as part of the 1898 college football season

The season began on October 1. As both Virginia and Vanderbilt had claims to Southern titles the previous year, their game in Louisville was most anticipated.

W. A. Lambeth said North Carolina had the best season of any southern team. But both Virginia and North Carolina were accused of playing ineligible players, and Caspar Whitney declared Sewanee champion of the south.

Season overview

Results and team statistics

Key

PPG = Average of points scored per game
PAG = Average of points allowed per game

Regular season

SIAA teams in bold.

Week One

Week Two

Week Three

Week Four

Week Five

Week Six

Week Seven

Week Eight

Week Nine

Week Ten

All-Southern team

W. A. Lambeth's All-Southern team:

References